Hosenfeld is a municipality in the district of Fulda, in Hesse, Germany.

References

Municipalities in Hesse
Fulda (district)